Small ubiquitin-related modifier 4 is a protein that in humans is encoded by the SUMO4 gene.

Function 

This gene is a member of the SUMO gene family. This family of genes encode small ubiquitin-related modifiers that are attached to proteins and control the target proteins' subcellular localization, stability, or activity. The protein described in this record is located in the cytoplasm and specifically modifies IKBA, leading to negative regulation of NF-kappa-B-dependent transcription of the IL12B gene. A specific polymorphism in this SUMO gene, which leads to the M55V substitution, has been associated with type I diabetes. The RefSeq contains this polymorphism.

Interactions 

SUMO4 has been shown to interact with IκBα.

References

Further reading